This is a list of singles that charted in the top ten of the Billboard Hot 100 during 1994.

Janet Jackson scored four top ten hits during the year with "Again", "Because of Love", "Any Time, Any Place", and "You Want This", the most among all other artists.

Top-ten singles

1993 peaks

1995 peaks

See also
 1994 in music
 List of Hot 100 number-one singles of 1994 (U.S.)
 Billboard Year-End Hot 100 singles of 1994

References

General sources

Joel Whitburn Presents the Billboard Hot 100 Charts: The Nineties
Additional information obtained can be verified within Billboard's online archive services and print editions of the magazine.

United States Hot 100 top ten
1994